Puryear is a city in Henry County, Tennessee, United States. The population was 671 at the 2010 census.

Geography
Puryear is located in northern Henry County at  (36.444853, -88.333770). U.S. Route 641 passes through the east side of the city, leading north  to Hazel, Kentucky, and south  to Paris, the Henry county seat. Tennessee State Route 140 passes through the center of Puryear, leading east  to U.S. Route 79 near Paris Landing State Park on Kentucky Lake, and west  to SR 69 near Jones Mill.

The Tennessee Valley Divide runs along the western edge of the city; most of Puryear drains north via the East Fork of the Clarks River, eventually reaching the Tennessee River just south of its confluence with the Ohio River, while the westernmost part of Puryear drains west via Clear Creek to the North Fork of the Obion River, a tributary of the Mississippi.

Demographics

As of the census of 2000, there were 667 people, 284 households, and 191 families residing in the city. The population density was 730.0 people per square mile (283.0/km2). There were 328 housing units at an average density of 359.0 per square mile (139.2/km2). The racial makeup of the city was 95.65% White, 2.70% African American, 0.15% Native American, 0.45% Asian, 0.45% from other races, and 0.60% from two or more races. Hispanic or Latino of any race were 0.75% of the population.

There were 284 households, out of which 26.8% had children under the age of 18 living with them, 53.9% were married couples living together, 9.5% had a female householder with no husband present, and 32.7% were non-families. 27.5% of all households were made up of individuals, and 14.1% had someone living alone who was 65 years of age or older. The average household size was 2.27 and the average family size was 2.73.

In the city, the population was spread out, with 19.8% under the age of 18, 8.7% from 18 to 24, 26.8% from 25 to 44, 22.9% from 45 to 64, and 21.7% who were 65 years of age or older. The median age was 41 years. For every 100 females there were 92.2 males. For every 100 females age 18 and over, there were 91.1 males.

The median income for a household in the city was $28,750, and the median income for a family was $36,042. Males had a median income of $22,315 versus $20,481 for females. The per capita income for the city was $17,131. About 7.4% of families and 10.8% of the population were below the poverty line, including 24.3% of those under age 18 and 9.3% of those age 65 or over.

References

Cities in Henry County, Tennessee